Duniyadari (Marathi: दुनियादारी) is a 2013 Indian Marathi-language romantic comedy drama film directed by Sanjay Jadhav and produced by Deepak Rane. The film is based on the novel of the same name by author Suhas Shirvalkar.

The film is about the journey of every one which eventually makes them realize the true face of life. It has been acclaimed by Marathi audience. Critical reception was positive. This film gave a boost to the Marathi film industry. This is the only Indian film of the decade (2010-2020) which has completed 50 weeks in Cinemas.

It had the most collection at box office for a film in Marathi which was broken by Timepass in 2014 and again by Lai Bhaari again by Sairat in 2016. The film was remade in Kannada in 2017 as Noorondu Nenapu and in Gujarati in 2017 as Duniyadari. It ran for more than 100 days in Maharashtra.

Plot
Duniyadari opens with grandma Shirin (Sai Tamhankar) with a streak of grey accompanying grandpa Pritam (Sushant Shelar) to Pune, grandchildren in tow. The story traces itself back to presumably the late 1970s (seen through the bell-bottom pants on the gentlemen and the polka-dot dresses and 'Asha Parekh' salwar kameezes on the ladies). Nothing is spelt out, but each character and its relevance in the plot is unveiled through the narrative that revolves around Shreyas Talwalkar (Swapnil Joshi). He is thrown into college in Pune on his mother's insistence. Under circumstances which are reminiscent of college life in the Hindi cinema of the 80s, Shreyas makes friends with DSP aka Digya (Ankush Choudhary) and his Katta gang. A do-gooder standing tall for friendships in the face of a creepy Saai (Jitendra Joshi), Shreyas becomes the voice of reason for the rustic gang.

He finds himself attracted to Shirin, but Meenu (Urmila Kanetkar) get attracted to Shreyas which creates a love triangle. Shirin is a student of Medical college and sister of Pritam. They are children of an MLA from Kolhapur, who hates Shirin, his own daughter. Shreyas accepts Meenu's proposal out of spite for Shirin (as she repeatedly turns down his advances) but is not sure about their future. Saai fixes his marriage with Shirin against her wish. Meenu later understands that Shreyas is deeply in love with Shirin. On Saai and Shirin's wedding day, Shreyas and his friends fight with Saai's gang. Finally Shirin marries Shreyas. She is aware that Shreyas is a patient of a deadly disease (probably blood cancer) and has only few remaining months of life. They are about to enter parenthood.

The film ends with a touching scene where all the friends, now in their early 50s, meet at the same katta of their college on Shreyas's birthday and express their feelings for him.

Cast 
 Swapnil Joshi as Shreyas Talwalkar
 Ankush Choudhary as Digambar Shankar Patil (Digya) / DSP
 Sai Tamhankar as Shirin Ghatge
 Urmila Kothare as Meenakshi Inamdar (Meenu)
 Jitendra Joshi as Sainath Dedgaonkar (Saai)
 Sushant Shelar as Pritam Ghatge (Shirin's brother) 
 Richa Pariyalli as Surekha Bhate (Digya's love interest) 
 Uday Sabnis as Inspector Ramesh Inamdar (Meenu's father) 
 Nagesh Bhosle as Vinayakrao Ghatge (Shirin and Pritam's father) 
 Shrirang Deshmukh as Diwakarrao Dedgaonkar (Saai's father) 
 Sunil Godbole as Anna Bhate (Surekha's father) 
 Uday Tikekar as Sudhir Talwalkar (Shreyas's father) 
 Varsha Usgaonkar as Rani Maa Talwalkar (Shreyas's mother) 
 Sandeep Kulkarni as Shreyas Gokhale / M.K. (Rani Maa's lover)
 Yogesh Shirsat as Shree 
 Nitesh Kalbande as Bunty
 Ajinkya Joshi as Ashkya
 Pranav Raorane as Sunil Bhosle (Sorry)
 Anand Abhyankar as College Principal (voice by Girish Oak)

Production
Sanjay Jadhav ace cameraman of films like Dombivali Fast, Jogwa, Mumbai Meri Jaan and director of Checkmate, Ringa Ringa, Fakta Ladh Mhana is the man behind the production house Dreaming 24/7. What makes Duniyadari more special with Jadhav's directing is the plot inspired from one of the all-time best seller's Duniyadari by eminent writer late Shri Suhas Shirvalkar. Though it is set in the 1970s, it remains related to today's youth.

Soundtrack

Release
Duniyadari was released in Maharashtra and Gujarat, Goa, Karnataka etc. acclaiming huge success outside Maharashtra. The film had a record 710 shows daily and more than 5,000 shows weekly across 270 theatres.

Reception
The film has received highly positive reviews. Duniyadari is a huge financial success in Marathi film industry and an all-time blockbuster. ABP Majha, a Marathi news channel, gave 4 out of 5 stars acclaiming film for its story, direction and brilliant acting of all the actors.

Box Office
Upon the release, the movie had slow start at the box office but positive word of mouth led to sold-out showings even after the tenth week of its release and the movie became the highest-grossing Marathi film of all time at that time, grossing . The film had run in cinema for 40 weeks. This is a unbroken record for the Indian film released in the decade 2010–2020.

See also
Highest grossing Marathi films

References

External links
 
 
 

2013 films
Films based on Indian novels
Indian drama road movies
Marathi films remade in other languages
2010s Marathi-language films
Indian buddy films
Films directed by Sanjay Jadhav